
Gmina Człuchów is a rural gmina (administrative district) in Człuchów County, Pomeranian Voivodeship, in northern Poland. Its seat is the town of Człuchów, although the town is not part of the territory of the gmina.

Villages
Gmina Człuchów contains the villages and settlements of Barkowo, Biskupnica, Brzeźno, Bukowo, Bukowo Człuchowskie, Chrząstówko, Chrząstowo, Czarnoszki, Czarnoszyce, Czarze, Dąbki, Dębnica, Dobojewo, Dziewiątka, Gębarzewo, Ględowo, Gostudź, Gozdnica, Grzybowo, Jaromierz, Jęczniki Małe, Jęczniki Wielkie, Jeziorno, Kątki, Kiełpin, Kiełpinek, Kołdowo, Krępsk, Krery, Krzyżanki, Kujanki, Mąkowo, Mirogniew, Mosiny, Murzynowo, Nieżywięć, Nowosiółki, Piaskowo, Płonica, Polnica, Polniczka, Przytok, Rogowo, Rychnowy, Sieroczyn, Skarszewo, Skórzewo, Śniaty, Sokole, Stara Rogoźnica, Stołczno, Wierzchowo, Wierzchowo-Dworzec, Zagórki, Zbrzyca and Zielątkowo.

Neighbouring gminas
Gmina Człuchów is bordered by the town of Człuchów and by the gminas of Chojnice, Czarne, Debrzno, Kamień Krajeński, Konarzyny, Przechlewo and Rzeczenica.

References
Polish official population figures 2006

Czluchow
Człuchów County